Samuel Sarfo (born 12 August 1990) is a Ghanaian footballer who plays for Kuwaiti club Al-Tadamon and the Ghana national team as a defender.

Club career
Born in Nsuta, Sarfo played at Cantonments as a youth. He later played for Liberty Professionals, combining his playing career with his job as a policeman. On 6 February 2018, Sarfo signed an 18-month contract with Iranian club Saipa.

On 5 July 2022, Sarfo joined Kuwaiti club Al-Tadamon.

Career statistics

International career
Sarfo made his international debut for Ghana in 2017.

Honours

Club
Al-Khaleej
First Division: 2021–22

References

1990 births
Living people
Ghanaian footballers
Ghana international footballers
Liberty Professionals F.C. players
Saipa F.C. players
Khaleej FC players
Al Tadhamon SC players
Ghana Premier League players
Association football defenders
Ghanaian expatriate footballers
Ghanaian expatriate sportspeople in Saudi Arabia
Expatriate footballers in Saudi Arabia
Ghanaian expatriate sportspeople in Iran
Expatriate footballers in Iran
Ghanaian expatriate sportspeople in Kuwait
Expatriate footballers in Kuwait
Persian Gulf Pro League players
Saudi First Division League players
Kuwait Premier League players
People from Ashanti Region